The 1918 Anhalt state election was held on 15 December 1918 to elect the 36 members of the Constituent National Assembly of the Free State of Anhalt.

Results

References 

Anhalt
Elections in Saxony-Anhalt